Chini Jan Rural District is a rural district (dehestan) in the Central District of Rudsar County, Gilan Province, Iran. At the 2006 census, its population was 11,653, in 3,371 families. The rural district has 20 villages.

References 

Rural Districts of Gilan Province
Rudsar County